María Noel Barrionuevo (born 16 May 1984) is an Argentine field hockey player.

She won the bronze medal at the 2008 Summer Olympics in Beijing and the silver medal at the 2012 Summer Olympics in London, and the silver medal at the 2020 Summer Olympics, with the Argentina national field hockey team.

Career 
Noel also won the 2010 World Cup in Rosario, Argentina, six Champions Trophy, the World League 2014–15, the gold medal at the 2007 Pan American Games and three Pan American Cups.

References

External links

1984 births
Living people
Argentine female field hockey players
Las Leonas players
Pan American Games silver medalists for Argentina
Olympic field hockey players of Argentina
Field hockey players at the 2007 Pan American Games
Field hockey players at the 2008 Summer Olympics
Field hockey players at the 2011 Pan American Games
Olympic bronze medalists for Argentina
Olympic medalists in field hockey
Olympic silver medalists for Argentina
Field hockey players at the 2012 Summer Olympics
Field hockey players at the 2020 Summer Olympics
Medalists at the 2012 Summer Olympics
Medalists at the 2008 Summer Olympics
Field hockey players at the 2015 Pan American Games
Pan American Games gold medalists for Argentina
Field hockey players at the 2016 Summer Olympics
Pan American Games medalists in field hockey
South American Games gold medalists for Argentina
South American Games medalists in field hockey
Female field hockey defenders
Competitors at the 2006 South American Games
Field hockey players at the 2019 Pan American Games
Medalists at the 2007 Pan American Games
Medalists at the 2011 Pan American Games
Medalists at the 2015 Pan American Games
Medalists at the 2019 Pan American Games
Medalists at the 2020 Summer Olympics
People from San Isidro Partido
Sportspeople from Buenos Aires Province
20th-century Argentine women
21st-century Argentine women